Following is a list of dams and reservoirs in Maryland.

All major dams are linked below.

Dams and reservoirs in Maryland 

This list is incomplete.  You can help Wikipedia by expanding it.

 Brighton Dam, Triadelphia Reservoir, Alternative Energy Associates Ltd. Partnership
 Burnt Mills Dam, Robert B. Morse Filtration Plant, Washington Suburban Sanitary Commission
 Conowingo Dam, Conowingo Reservoir, Susquehanna Power Co. & Philadelphia Electric Co.
 Cumberland Dam, unnamed reservoir on the Potomac River, privately owned (on West Virginia border)
 Deep Creek Dam, Deep Creek Lake, Pennsylvania Electric Company
 Jennings Randolph Dam, Jennings Randolph Lake, United States Army Corps of Engineers (on the West Virginia border)
 Liberty Dam, Liberty Reservoir, Baltimore City Department of Public Works
 Little Seneca Dam, Little Seneca Lake, Washington Suburban Sanitary Commission
 Loch Raven Dam, Loch Raven Reservoir, Baltimore City Department of Public Works
 Piney Run Dam, Piney Run Reservoir, Carroll County, Maryland
 Prettyboy Dam, Prettyboy Reservoir, Baltimore City Department of Public Works
 Rocky Gap Dam, Lake Habeeb, Maryland Department of Natural Resources
 Rocky Gorge Dam, Rocky Gorge Reservoir, Washington Suburban Sanitary Commission
 Savage River Dam, Savage River Reservoir, Upper Potomac River Commission

References 

 
 
Maryland
Dams
Dams